List of Hong Kong journalists and media professionals, past and present:

C
 Lavender Cheung, i-Cable TV chief anchor
 Cheung Wai-tsz, former Cable TV reporter, now ATV Home journalist and news anchor
 Ching Cheong, The Straits Times Hong Kong correspondent, once jailed for political reasons in Mainland China

D
 Jason Dasey, South China Morning Post columnist, former ESPN, CNN International and BBC World anchor

J
 Jeffrey James, anchor at HKTVB Pearl, Deutsche Welle DW-TV, and CNBC

K
 Kwok Tse Ting, ATV news reporter based in Guangzhou

L
 Jimmy Lai, founder and publisher of Apple Daily
 Willy Wo-Lap Lam, former China head of the South China Morning Post
 Kevin Lau, former editor-in-chief of Ming Pao who was stabbed in an attack widely considered to be an endangerment of press freedom

R
 Renato Reyes, ATV journalist

T
 William Tarrant, journalist in early colonial Hong Kong

 
Hong Kong
Journalists